Heartland is a Canadian dramatic television series, it follows sisters Amy and Lou Fleming, their grandfather Jack Bartlett, and Ty Borden, through the highs and lows of life at their ranch.

Total nominations and awards for the cast

Canadian Screen Awards
The Canadian Screen Awards are given annually by the Academy of Canadian Cinema & Television recognizing excellence in Canadian film, English-language television, and digital media. Heartland has two nominations, with one win.

Directors Guild of Canada Awards
The Directors Guild of Canada hosts an annual awards ceremony recognizing achievement in directing, production design, picture and sound editing. Heartland has eight wins out twelve nominations.

Gemini Awards
The Gemini Awards were annual awards given by the Academy of Canadian Cinema & Television to recognize achievements in English-language television. Heartland garnered nine nominations, with one win.

Joey Awards
The Joey Awards are given annually to young Canadian performers in film and television. Heartland has been nominated eight times, winning twice.

Leo Awards
The Leo Awards are annual awards honouring the best in film and television in the province of British Columbia.  Heartland has been nominated five times.

Rosie Awards
The Rosie Awards is the name given to the Alberta Film and Television Awards, presented annually by Alberta Media Production Industries Association (AMPIA).

Young Artist Awards
The Young Artist Awards are awarded annually to young actors in film and television. Heartland has one win from four nominations.

References

Heartland